Cheryl Mendelson is a novelist and non-fiction writer. She is the author of Home Comforts: The Art and Science of Keeping House (1999), and a trilogy of novels, Morningside Heights (2003), Love, Work, Children (2005), and Anything for Jane (2007). In 2019, Home Comforts was ranked by Slate as one of the 50 best nonfiction books of the past 25 years.

She received her Ph.D. in Philosophy from the University of Rochester and her J.D. from Harvard Law School. She was formerly a professor of philosophy at Purdue University and Columbia University, and published essays on ethical theory. She is currently lecturing at Barnard College.

She was also a lawyer with several New York law firms in the 1980s. In 1990-91, she was a Fellow at the Hastings Center.

Her husband, Edward Mendelson, is an English professor at Columbia University.

References

Citations

Sources 

 Contemporary Authors, vol. 201.

External links
 Interview at BN.com
 Mendelson's books at Random House

21st-century American novelists
American women novelists
Harvard Law School alumni
University of Rochester alumni
Purdue University faculty
Columbia University faculty
Living people
Year of birth missing (living people)
21st-century American women writers
Novelists from Indiana
Novelists from New York (state)
American women academics